The 1975 season of the Lion Shield was the fifth recorded season of top flight association football competition in Tonga. Kolofo'ou No.1
won the championship, their fifth successive title. Navutoka FC were runners-up.

Teams 
 Kolofoʻou
 Latakia FC
 Talafo''ou FC
 United Eleven
 Navutoka FC
 Ngeleʻia FC
 Veitongo I
 Veitongo II

References

Tonga Major League seasons
Tonga
Football